Archibald C. Campbell (1880 – 14 September 1918) was a Scottish professional footballer who played in the Scottish League for Ayr United, Ayr, Abercorn and Clyde as an outside left.

Personal life 
Campbell served as a driver in the Royal Field Artillery during the First World War and died of wounds on the Western Front on 14 September 1918. He was buried in La Kreule Military Cemetery, Hazebrouck.

Career statistics

References 

Scottish footballers
1918 deaths
British Army personnel of World War I
British military personnel killed in World War I
1880 births
Royal Field Artillery soldiers
Scottish Football League players
Kirkintilloch Rob Roy F.C. players
Sportspeople from Kirkintilloch
Association football outside forwards
Carlisle United F.C. players
Clyde F.C. players
Ayr F.C. players
Ayr United F.C. players
Abercorn F.C. players